This is a list of Tamils of Sri Lanka by their country of domicile or origin. All communities that speak (or spoke) Tamil and originally came from Sri Lanka are included. Tamils of Sri Lanka today are a trans-national minority and are found across the globe.

Sri Lanka

Academics

Srikanthalakshmi Arulanandam - Principle Librarian at the University of Jaffna
A. Thurairajah - Professor, Vice Chancellor of University of Peradeniya, Civil Engineer (Akbar Bridge in University of Peradeniya was constructed by him), Founder of Thurai Law ( About Soil) 
 T. Nadaraja - Chancellor of the University of Jaffna; Professor and Dean of the Faculty of Law, University of Ceylon
 S. Raveendranath - Vice-Chancellor of the Eastern University of Sri Lanka
 K. Sivathamby - emeritus professor of University of Jaffna; prominent Tamil scholar, sociologist and author of books
 X. Thaninayagam - scholar, author and historian
 Valentine Joseph - was a Sri Lankan Tamil mathematician, noted for his contributions to education
 Rajini Thiranagama - murdered human rights activist and author of books; head of the Department of Anatomy, University of Jaffna; member of University Teachers for Human Rights assassinated by Tamil Tigers.
 T. Varagunam - Chancellor of the Eastern University of Sri Lanka

Activists

 Fr. Mary Bastian - Roman Catholic parish priest and human rights activist
 Fr. Thiruchelvam Nihal Jim Brown - Roman Catholic parish priest and activist; missing since August 20, 2006; presumed dead
 Radhika Coommaraswamy - human rights activist; Under-Secretary-General of the United Nations and Special Representative for Children and Armed Conflict
 Richard de Zoysa - journalist, author, human rights activist and actor; was abducted and murdered
 Rev. Chandra Fernando - Roman Catholic parish priest, human rights activist; Batticaloa Citizens Committee member; murdered
 Rajan Hoole - professor of Department of Mathematics, University of Jaffna; human rights activist; author of books; member of University Teachers for Human Rights
 Kethesh Loganathan - Deputy Secretary General of the Peace Secretariat of the Government of Sri Lanka; assassinated
 Rajini Thiranagama - murdered human rights activist and author of books; head of the Department of Anatomy, University of Jaffna; member of University Teachers for Human Rights
 Chelvy Thiyagarajah - feminist and International PEN award winner

Actors and directors

 Sabby Jey- New Zealand, Sri Lankan Tamil actress and model.
 Richard de Zoysa - stage drama actor and Sinhala film actor brutally killed by Sri Lankan government paramilitary forces during the JVP insurrection; of Tamil and Singhala mixed origin; son of Manorani Sarawanamuttu 
 Rukmani Devi - popular film actress
 Suresh Joachim film actor and producer
 Chandran Rutnam - film producer / director

Sri Lankan international and first class cricketers, umpires, and administrators

 Ignatius Anandappa - late Sri Lankan international cricket umpire
 Russel Arnold - former Sri Lankan Test cricketer and international commentator
 Roy Dias - former Sri Lankan Test cricketer/vice captain
 Kandiah Thirugnansampandapillai Francis - international Test/ODI umpire
 S. Illangaratnam - late Sri Lankan cricketer, stalwart of Moratuwa and Bloomfield cricket clubs prior to the Test match era and the coach of Bloomfield C&AC
 Pradeep Jayaprakashdaran - Sri Lankan One Day International (ODI) cricket player
 Sridharan Jeganathan - late NCC and Sri Lankan Test cricketer/off spin bowler
 Vinothen John - former NCC and Sri Lankan Test cricketer/opening fast medium bowler
 Angelo Mathews - Sri Lankan all rounder and former captain of the Sri Lankan cricket team
 Muttiah Muralitharan - Sri Lankan bowler
 Selliah Ponnadurai - late international cricket umpire
 Ravindra Pushpakumara - Karupiah Raveendra Pushpakumara, born to a Tamil father and Sinhala mother
 Ravi Ratnayeke (Joseph Raveendran Ratnayeke) -  former Sri Lankan vice captain; Tamil-Sinhala mixed
 Mahadevan Sathasivam - cricket batsman
 Mario Villavarayan - former NCC and first class cricketer
 Suthershini Sivanantham - Sri Lankan women's cricketer

Other athletes and sports people

 Nagalingam Ethirveerasingam - high jumper; v Olympic Games and Asian Games; winner of Ceylon's first gold medal in international track and field competition (high jump, 1958 Asian Games)
Sujan Perera, footballer
 Sunil Roshan Appuhamy

Authors, writers, poets and artists

 Alagu Subramaniam - Writer, a prominent figure in London's Bloomsbury literary circle, a Barrister-at-Law of The Honourable Society of Lincoln's Inn, and an Advocate of the Supreme Court of Ceylon
 V. Akilesapillai - author, scholar, poet and Hindu activist
 Ananda Coomaraswamy - Orientalist, author, philosopher and metaphysician
 Dominic Jeeva - author and social activist
 S. Kanapathipillai - scholar
 Muttukumara Kavirajar - poet and Hindu activist
 Kumaraswamy Pulavar - scholar, poet and Hindu activist
 D. Raja Segar - painter and sculptor
 C. W. Thamotharampillai - editor and publisher of classical Tamil poetry and grammar; the oldest extant written work in Tamil, Tolkapiyam - Porulathikaram, was discovered and published by him with a commentary

Business people

 Ken Balendra - Sri Lankan corporate leader and executive; holds and has held many corporate positions in Sri Lanka and the region
 Chandran Rutnam - filmmaker and owner of Lionair
 Suresh Joachim- is well known as the co-founder of WBBAS, No Poverty No Disease No War, World Peace Marathon and Suresh Joachim International Group Of Companies.

Diplomats

 Yogendra Duraiswamy -  first batch of Ceylon Overseas Service, 1949
 Tamara Kunanayakam -  Sri Lankan Ambassador to Cuba (2008-2009); Permanent Representative of Sri Lanka to the United Nations Office at Geneva

Historical figures

 Arumaipperumal - Batticaloa chieftain who led a rebellion against the British colonial occupiers in 1803
 Cankili I (Sankili Segarajasekaran) - a prominent king of the Jaffna Kingdom
 Cankili II - last king of the Jaffna kingdom
Migapulle Arachchi - Feudal lord of Jaffna Kingdom who rebelled against the Portuguese colonial occupiers in 1620.
 Pandara Vannian (Kulasegaram Vairamuthu Pandaravanniyan) - Vanni chieftain who challenged British rule

Tamil historical figures who ruled the Sinhalese kingdom 

 Sena and Guttika - Tamil horse merchants who ascended the throne in Anuradhapura, 237-215 BC
Ellalan - ruled Anuradhapura from 205 BC to 161 BC; considered a most impartial and just monarch
 Pulahatta - Tamil king, ruled from Anuradhapura 103 -100 BC
 Bahiya - Tamil king, ruled from Anuradhapura 100-98 BC
 Panya Mara - Tamil king, ruled from Anuradhapura 98-91 BC
 Pilaya Mara - Tamil King, ruled from Anuradapura 91-90 BC
 Dathiya - Tamil King of Anuradhapura 447-450 AD
 Pandu - Tamil king from 436 to 441 BC
 Parindu - son of Pandu,  ruled for one year, 441 BC
 Khudda Parinda - brother of Pandu, ruled 441-447 BC
 Tiritara - 447 BC
 Dathiya - 447-450 BC
 Pithiya - 450-452
 Chempaha Perumal - a Jaffna Tamil who ascended the Sinhala throne as King Bhuvanekabahu VI of Kotte

Journalists and broadcasters

 S. P. Mylvaganam - first Tamil announcer of the Commercial Service of Radio Ceylon
 A. Nadesan - murdered Virakesari newspaper journalist
 M. Nimalrajan - murdered journalist, BBC reporter
 K. S. Raja - Radio Ceylon announcer
 Claude Selveratnam - Radio Ceylon announcer
 Kailayar Sellanainar Sivakumaran - broadcaster and Journalist in English and Tamil
 Taraki Sivaram -  journalist, military analyst editor of TamilNet news website, author of books
 J. S. Tissainayagam - journalist and first winner of the Peter Mackler Award for Courageous and Ethical Journalism

Lawyers and judges

 V. Casipillai - Crown Proctor, President of the Jaffna Hindu Board, co-founder of Jaffna Hindu College, founder of Parvathy Maha Vidyalayam and other educational institutions
 Hon. Justice V. Manicavasagar - Justice of the Supreme Court of Sri Lanka, Chancellor of the University of Jaffna and Chairman of the Commercial Bank of Ceylon
 K. Kanag-Isvaran - Lawyer and President's Counsel
 S. Selliah - Justice of the Court of Appeal, Judge of the High Court, Magistrate
 S. Sharvananda - Chief Justice of Sri Lanka, Justice of the Supreme Court of Sri Lanka and Governor of the Western Province
K. Sripavan - 44th Chief justice, Democratic Socialist Republic of Sri Lanka
 H. D. Thambiah - Justice of the Court of Appeal, Justice of the Supreme Court, and Chief Justice of Sri Lanka
 H. W. Thambiah - Justice of the Supreme Court

Militants and rebels

Velupillai Prabhakaran (Karikalan) - Leader of the LTTE and of the de facto state of Tamil Eelam till 2009.
Charles Lucas Anthony (Seelan) - senior Tamil Tiger  commander
 V. Baheerathakumar (Theepan) - senior Tamil Tiger commander, de facto military leader
 V. Balakumaran - former leader of Eelam Revolutionary Organisation of Students, later joined the Tamil Tigers
 Anton Balasingham - chief political strategist and chief negotiator for the Tamil Tigers
 S. Chandrakanthan (Pillayan) - Tamil Tiger member, defected to the Sri Lankan Government; Chief Minister of the Eastern Province
 Douglas Devananda - Tiger deserter; former militant turned politician; founder and leader of the Eelam People's Democratic Party political party and a pro-government paramilitary organization; Government Minister and Member of Parliament
 B. Kandiah (Balraj) - senior Tamil Tiger commander
 S. Krishnakumar (Kittu) - senior Tamil Tiger commander
 G. Mahendraraja (Mahattaya) - Deputy Leader of the Tamil Tigers and head of the People's Front of Liberation Tigers
 V. Muralitharan (Karuna Amman) - senior Tamil Tiger commander, defected to the Sri Lankan Government; Government Minister and appointed Member of Parliament
 B. Nadesan - Tamil Tiger political leader
 A. Neminathan (CRaju) - senior Tamil Tiger commander
 R. Parthipan (Thileepan) - Tamil Tiger political wing member who died during a hunger strike
 S. Pathmanathan (KP) - senior Tamil Tiger member; now collaborating with the Sri Lankan government
 Arul Pragasam - founder and leader of Eelam Revolutionary Organisation of Students
 Thenmozhi Rajaratnam - assassin who killed Rajiv Gandhi
 E. Ratnasabapathy - founder member of Eelam Revolutionary Organisation of Students
 S. Ravishankar (Charles) - Tamil Tiger military intelligence wing leader
 Sri Sabaratnam - leader of Tamil Eelam Liberation Organization
 T. Sivanesan ( Soosai) - Tamil Tiger Sea Wing leader
 P. Sivaparan (Nediyawan) - senior Tamil Tiger member
 S. Sivashankar (Pottu Amman) - Tamil Tigers Intelligence Wing leader, was number 2 in the organisation
 V. Sornalingam (Shankar) - founder of Sea Tigers and Air Tigers wing of the Tamil Tigers
 S. P. Thamilselvan - Tamil Tiger political leader
 N. Thangathurai - co-founder and leader of Tamil Eelam Liberation Organization
 K. Ulaganathan (Ramanan) - senior Tamil Tiger commander
 V. Vasanthan (Miller) - first Black Tiger
 S. Yogachandran (Kuttimani) - co-founder and leader of Tamil Eelam Liberation Organization

Military

 Air Vice Marshal P.B. Premachandra - former Chief of Staff, Sri Lanka Air Force
 Air Vice Marshal Ravi Arunthavanathan - former Deputy Chief of Staff, Sri Lanka Air Force and current Additional Secretary, Ministry of Defence
 Major General Y. Balaretnarajah, Vishista Seva Vibhushanaya, Uttama Seva Padakkama, National Defence College, India, Sri Lanka Armoured Corps - Chief of Staff, Sri Lanka Army (1992-1992)
 Rear Admiral Rajan Kadiragamar, Royal Victorian Order, Royal Ceylon Navy - former Commander of the Sri Lankan Navy
 Air Vice Marshal A. Kumaresan, Rana Sura Padakkama, Uttama Seva Padakkama, Psc (British Army), Sri Lanka Air Force - current Director of Planning, Sri Lanka Air Force
 Major General Anton Muttukumaru, OBE, Efficiency Decoration; Aide-de-camp, Ceylon Light Infantry; first Ceylonese Commander of the Sri Lanka Army
 Vice Admiral Travis Sinniah, Weera Wickrama Vibhushanaya, Rana Wickrama Padakkama, Rana Sura Padakkama, Uttama Seva Padakkama, ndu - 21st Commander of the Sri Lanka Navy, veteran of attack flotilla
 Major General E. G. Thevanayagam, Vishista Seva Vibhushanaya - Commandant of the Sri Lanka Army Volunteer Force (1984–1986)
 Major General Chelliah Thurairaja, Uttama Seva Padakkama, Sri Lanka Army Medical Corps - former Director Army Medical Services and Colonel Commandant Sri Lanka Army Medical Corps
 Colonel David Rockwood, KStJ, ED, JP - Deputy Commandant of the Volunteer Force

Politicians

 Selvam Adaikalanathan - President of the Tamil Eelam Liberation Organization and Member of Parliament
 A. Amirthalingam - leader of the Tamil United Liberation Front, Leader of the Opposition and Member of Parliament
 V. Anandasangaree - leader of the Tamil United Liberation Front and Member of Parliament
 Sir Ponnambalam Arunachalam CCS - pre-independence politician and civil servant; Registrar General; member of Executive Council of Ceylon; member of Legislative Council of Ceylon
 A. Canagaratnam - member of the Legislative Council of Ceylon, Chairman of the first Urban Council of Jaffna; founder of Canagaratnam Maha Vidyalayam (formerly Stanley College) in Jaffna
 S. J. V. Chelvanayakam - political leader of the Sri Lankan Tamil people; founder and leader of the Illankai Tamil Arasu Kachchi (Federal Party); leader of the Tamil United Liberation Front; Member of Parliament
 A. Coomaraswamy - member of the Legislative Council of Ceylon
 Sir Muthu Coomaraswamy - member of the Legislative Council of Ceylon; first Asian to be knighted; father of author Ananda Coomaraswamy
 Douglas Devananda - Militant turned politician; founder and leader of the Eelam People's Democratic Party paramilitary group; Government Minister and Member of Parliament
 K. W. Devanayagam - former minister, Member of Parliament, lawyer who represented Kalkudah seat
 Waithilingam Duraiswamy - pre-independence Sri Lankan lawyer, politician and speaker of the State Council of Ceylon
 Alfred Duraiappah - Member of Parliament from 1960 to 1964; Mayor of Jaffna
 Jeyaraj Fernandopulle - slain SLFP politician, a Negombo chetty
 Mano Ganesan - leader of the Democratic People's Front political party; Member of Parliament; member of Western Provincial Council
 Praba Ganeshan - MP
 Lakshman Kadirgamar - Minister of Foreign Affairs; nominated Member of Parliament
 N. Kumaraguruparan - General Secretary of Democratic People's Front political party; General Secretary and Senior Vice President of All Ceylon Tamil Congress; member of the Colombo Municipal Council; member of Western Provincial Council
 Sir Arunachalam Mahadeva - Minister of Home Affairs; member of the State Council of Ceylon; member of the Legislative Council of Ceylon
 S. Nadesan - member of the State Council of Ceylon, Member of Parliament, Senator
 Joseph Pararajasingham - Member of Parliament
 C. Ponnambalam - first Mayor of Jaffna
 G. G. Ponnambalam - political leader of the Sri Lankan Tamil people; founder and leader of the All Ceylon Tamil Congress; government minister and Member of Parliament
Kumar Ponnambalam - Nationalist politician and human rights activist; leader of All Ceylon Tamil Congress; presidential candidate
 Suresh Premachandran - leader of the Eelam People's Revolutionary Liberation Front and Member of Parliament
 Sir Ponnambalam Ramanathan - pre-independence politician and political leader of the Sri Lankan Tamil people; Solicitor General of Ceylon; member of Legislative Council of Ceylon
 N. Raviraj - Member of Parliament
 James T. Rutnam - historian, educationalist, author and politician
 A. Sabapathy - member of Legislative Council of Ceylon; one of the founders of Jaffna Hindu College; editor of Hindu Organ; President of Jaffna Association
 T. M. Sabaratnam - member of Legislative Council of Ceylon; President of the Vattrapalai Kannagi Amman Kovil Trust
 R. Sampanthan - Leader of Tamil National Alliance political party; Member of Parliament
 S. Sellamuttu, OBE - Colombo mayor, 1951
 N. Shanmugathasan - General Secretary of the Ceylon Communist Party (Maoist)
 C. Sittampalam - Minister of Posts and Telecommunications in the first Cabinet of independent Ceylon; Member of Parliament
 S. Sivamaharajah - Member of Parliament; managing director of Namathu Eelanadu
 M. Sivasithamparam - Deputy Speaker of the Parliament
 C. Suntharalingam - Government Minister and Member of Parliament
 Bala Tampoe - veteran trade unionist; General Secretary of the Ceylon Mercantile, Industrial and General Workers Union
 Arumugam Thondaman - leader of the CWC
 S. Thondaman - leader of the Ceylon Workers' Congress, Government Minister, Member of Parliament
 Murugeysen Tiruchelvam - Government Minister and Senator
 Neelan Tiruchelvam - Member of Parliament
 Sir Kanthiah Vaithianathan KBE CCS - Minister for Housing, Industry and Social Service; first Permanent Secretary to the Ministry of External Affairs and Defence (1947–1952); Senator
 A. Vinayagamoorthy - President of All Ceylon Tamil Congress and Member of Parliament
 Sarojini Yogeswaran - Mayor of Jaffna
 V. Yogeswaran - co-leader of the Tamil United Liberation Front and Member of Parliament

Religious figures

 Arumuka Navalar - Hindu reformer and author of books from Jaffna
 Swami Vipulananda - Hindu reformer and author of books
 Yogaswami - Hindu ascetic from Jaffna

Australia

Activists

 Christie Jayaratnam Eliezer - Professor of Mathematics in University of Ceylon, University of Malaya and La Trobe University in Australia; recipient of Order of Australia

Business people

 Maha Sinnathamby - property developer; the man behind Australia's largest real estate project; frequently listed in BRW's annual list of the 200 richest Australians

Singers

 Kamahl (Kandiah Kamalesvaran) - singer
 Dhee (Dheekshitha Venkadeshan) - singer

Canada

Academics

 Alfred Jeyaratnam Wilson - peacemaker, politician and author of books on Sri Lanka

Actors and directors

 Rohan Fernando - filmmaker born in Jaffna
 Lenin M. Sivam - film director; directed the critically acclaimed film 1999
 Maitreyi Ramakrishnan- actress; Never Have I Ever
 Rajiv Surendra - actor, artist and author

Athletes and sports people

 Trevin Bastiampillai - Canadian cricketer
 Manoj David - Canadian cricketer
 Arvind Kandappah - Canadian cricketer
 Sanjayan Thuraisingam - Canadian cricketer
 Suresh Joachim - Multiple Guinness World Record Holder

Authors, writers, poets and musicians

 Shyam Selvadurai - author of Funny Boy and Cinnamon Gardens
SJ Sindu - author of Marriage of a Thousand Lies, professor at University of Toronto Scarborough

Business people

 Roy Ratnavel - Business executive and the author of the book Prisoner #1056.

Politicians

 Gary Anandasangaree - MP for Scarborough-Rouge Park
 Vijay Thanigasalam - MPP for Scarborough-Rouge Park
 Logan Kanapathi - MPP for Markham-Thornhill, former Markham City Councillor, first Tamil Canadian elected to political office (2006)
 Neethan Shan - former Toronto City Councillor
 Rathika Sitsabaiesan - former Canadian politician from Toronto; the New Democratic Party (NDP) Member of Parliament for Scarborough-Rouge River; the first Tamil elected to the Canadian Parliament

India

Actors and directors

 Poongkothai Chandrahasan - actress and Harvard-trained filmmaker
 Suresh Joachim - actor, producer, and singer
 Balu Mahendra - prominent Kollywood film director

Authors, writers, poets and artists

 V. Kanakasabhai - lawyer, historian and Dravidologist of Sri Lankan Tamil descent

Politicians
 E. M. V. Naganathan - one of the founders of the Illankai Tamil Arasu Kachchi (Federal Party); Member of Parliament

Athletes
Anand Amritraj

Malaysia

Academics

 Shan Ratnam - professor and researcher

Athletes and sports people

 Punch Gunalan - former national badminton player and IBF Executive Deputy President
 Mahadevan Sathasivam - former captain of the Malaysian cricket team
 K. Gurusamy - Malaysian Footballer

Authors, writers, poets and artists

 Rani Manicka - writer
 Manicasothy Saravanamuttu - editor of The Straits Echo in Malaya (1931–1941); credited with 'saving' Penang during Japanese invasion in 1941; author of The Sara Saga

Business people

 Vijay Eswaran - Group MD; CEO of the QI Group of companies
 Tan Sri G. Gnanalingam - executive chairman of Westport; ranked 29th in the 2007 Forbes Asia List of the 40 Richest Malaysians
 Ananda Krishnan - Malaysia's richest man and 62nd Richest Man in the world according to the 2009 Forbes Billionaire List
 Bastianpillai Paul Nicholas - the first non-British businessman who endeavoured to become one of the top bankers in the then Malaya

Civil servants

 Tan Sri Dr Ramon Navaratnam - Malaysian economist

Politicians

 Tan Sri Devaki Krishnan - former politician
 Sivarasa Rasiah - human rights lawyer and vice-president of the opposition Parti Keadilan Rakyat (People's Justice Party)
 D. R. Seenivasagam - founder of People's Progressive Party in Malaysia
 Datuk Dr S Vijayaratnam - former Parti Gerakan Rakyat Malaysia Vice-president

Singapore

Academics

 Philip Jeyaretnam - professor of law; member of Public Service Commission
 Shan Ratnam - former Head of Department of Obstetrics & Gynaecology at the National University of Singapore

Authors, writers, poets and artists

 Edwin Thumboo - poet

Civil servants

 K. S. Rajah - former Supreme Court Judge

Politicians

 Joshua Benjamin Jeyaretnam - former Solicitor General and perennial opposition politician of the Workers' Party of Singapore
 Sinnathamby Rajaratnam - politician, deputy prime minister, one of the founding fathers of Singapore
 Tharman Shanmugaratnam - politician and deputy prime minister

United Kingdom

Academics

 Ganesh Sittampalam - Guinness World Record holder as the youngest person in the UK to pass an A-Level in 1988, aged only nine years and four months old at the time
 Sabaratnam Arulkumaran - is a Sri Lankan Tamil physician, former president of the Royal College of Obstetricians and Gynaecologists and the International Federation of Gynaecology and Obstetrics, and president-elect of the British Medical Association.
 Maheshi N. Ramasamy - is a British-Sri Lankan physician and lecturer. She is currently working as one of the chief investigators at the Oxford Vaccine Group.

Activists

 S. J. Emmanuel - priest, academic, and activist; President of the Global Tamil Forum; Vicar General of the Jaffna Diocese

Actors/actresses 
Amara Karan, British actress, whose parents moved to the UK from Zambia for work.

Athletes and sports people

Dimitri Mascarenhas - international cricketer, plays for England; born to Sri Lankan Bharatakula Tamil parents in the UK, brought up in Australia and the UK
 Murugan Thiruchelvam - British child prodigy chess player

Comedians

 Romesh Ranganathan - British comedian and actor from Crawley

Musicians and singers
 Arjun - recording artist, born to a Tamil father
 M.I.A. (Mathangi "Maya" Arulpragasam) - British rapper, singer, songwriter, record producer, and fashion designer
Siva Kaneswaran - member of the English-Irish boy band The Wanted, born to a Tamil father
Ashan Pillai- British violist and professor

Journalists and broadcasters
 George Alagiah - BBC reporter and journalist
 James Coomarasamy - BBC reporter and journalist
 Dharshini David - BBC reporter and journalist
 Tim Kash - MTV and BBC reporter and journalist

Politicians 

 Thangam Debbonaire - Labour Party MP, born to a mixed Indian-Sri Lankan Tamil father
Dileeni Daniel-Selvaratnam, Governor of Anguilla

United States

Academics

 Stanley Jeyaraja Tambiah - retired Harvard University professor of anthropology and author of several books

Business people
 Kavichandran Alexander (Kavi Alexander) - owner of US record label Water Lily Acoustics; engineer; won 1993 Grammy Award for Ry Cooder's album A Meeting by the River
 Sanjay Kumar - former Chief Executive of Computer Associates
 Kumar Mahadeva - former Chief Executive of Cognizant Technology Solutions
 Raj Rajaratnam - hedge fund manager and the founder and Managing General Partner of The Galleon Group; on Forbes Richest Americans List

Musicians and singers
 Clarence Jey - songwriter and composer for US Late Night host Jimmy Fallon's 2013 Grammy-winning record Blow Your Pants Off; songwriter and producer for Emmy-winning US TV animation series Growing Up Creepie; producer and songwriter for Rebecca Black's viral hit song "Friday"

Politicians
 V. Rudrakumaran - Prime Minister of the Transnational Government of Tamil Eelam

See also
 Tamil diaspora

References

 List
Tamils, Sri Lankan
Tamils, Sri Lankan
Sri Lankan Tamils